Carenum fugitivum is a species of ground beetle in the subfamily Scaritinae. It was described by Blackburn in 1888.

References

fugitivum
Beetles described in 1888